North Albion Collegiate Institute (abbreviated as North Albion CI, NACI or North Albion) is a high school in the Etobicoke area of the city of Toronto, Ontario, Canada. It is part of the Toronto District School Board. Prior to 1998, it was part of the Etobicoke Board of Education. Its motto is Virtus, Officium, Vertias ("Excellence, Service, Truth").

History
The school constructed in 1961 and opened on September 4, 1962 to serve the growing suburb of Rexdale as Etobicoke's eleventh high school and its tenth collegiate. The North Albion school was designed by architects Craig, Madill, Abram and Ingleson.

The high school has a variety of different clubs over the years ranging from the student council, year book club, Deca, Model UN, chess club. These clubs have been the foundation of this school since its inception. Although over the years some clubs dissipate as leadership over these clubs varies from year to year, many of these clubs have been around for a long enough period of time to create a culture that is lasting and creates an atmosphere that encourages creativity and success. The sports teams of these clubs have always been vibrant although the selection of athletes have always been limited due to the socio-economic class the school is surrounded by. However, the athletes have always managed to make the sports teams a major cornerstone of the school and has over the years achieved some incredible accolades due to the fostering of these athletes. Most notable is the cricket teams, volleyball teams and basketball teams that have come out from this school.

The enrollment of the school is 838 students. This building can hold up to 1,095 pupils.

On 23 September 2014, one of the students Hamid Aminzada age 19 was stabbed in the school hallway while he was trying to defuse a fight among two fellow students. He later died in hospital due to his injuries and excessive bleeding.

Overview
North Albion earned a reputation for academic and athletic excellence from the time of its inception through the 1980s. In recent years, discipline has improved and, as a result, the post-secondary success rate has been rising dramatically. From 2000 to 2004, the graduation rate rose to 40%. It is placed above other local schools such as West Humber Collegiate Institute, Thistletown Collegiate Institute, and  Martingrove Collegiate Institute, as a school known for reasonable excellence in academics. 
 
Community involvement is shown by the institute's contributions through the Student Government, Parent Council, Leadership Club, Breakfast Club, the United Way Committee, the Duke of Edinburgh Club, World Vision Volunteers, Crime Stoppers, and by its participating in community beautification days. An integral part of N.A.C.I. is the multi-grade, whole school Teacher Advisor Program that meets regularly. Although the area surrounding North Albion has been considered an area that has been plagued with violence the students have always been the cornerstone of this school as they've always rallied together through the hard times to overcome obstacles through the support of administration and faculty. The awareness within the community about this school has dramatically increased and it has now become a school that attracts over 1000 students through its doors every day.

Its feeder schools include North Kipling Junior Middle School and Smithfield Middle School as well as nearby St. Andrew and St. Angela Separate Schools.

North Albion became the first school in North America to offer Steel band as a full credit course in high school.

Building
North Albion Collegiate Institute is a  two-storey secondary school in 12.16 acres of land, features 29 academic classrooms, six science labs, seven computer labs, two music rooms, an visual arts room, a drama room, three vocational shops for automotive and construction, a 750-seated auditorium, cafeteria with servery, three gymnasiums with the larger one that can divided, and a library. It also has a child care centre in the northwestern corner of the school.

The building has a composite layout, like most high schools in Etobicoke built in the 1950s and 1960s, it has the auditorium located separately in the southwestern corner and the locker color accents of white, orange, gold, light yellow and blue. There are 12 fire exits located in the corner of the school.

Crest
During the 1962-63 inaugural academic year, the Hon. J. Keiller MacKay opened the school officially and gave North Albion its motto: Virtus, Officium, Veritas – Excellence, Service, Truth. The Olympian torch and the book below the motto on the crest signify the struggle for the light of knowledge. The trees are for growth. We chose the mountain ash for its white flowers and orange berries. The triangle in the centre is a blue spruce to give us the school colours of orange, blue and white.

The G.M. Hull Award commemorates North Albion C.I.'s former Principal Mr. Hull. It is NACI's most prestigious award and is given to a student in the graduating class who best represents his or her grade.

Notable alumni
Teri Austin, actress
Johnny Legend, stand-up comedian, radio show host and actor.
Dean McDermott, actor and husband of Tori Spelling
Bruce McDonald, film director (The Tracey Fragments, Highway 61, Roadkill, Hard Core Logo)
Craig Ramsay (former NHL player and coach)
John L. Wallace, medical researcher; co-founder of NicOx and founder of Antibe Therapeutics; Fellow of the Royal Society of Canada)
Andrés Fresenga, current soccer player with the Ottawa Fury FC

See also
List of high schools in Ontario

References

External links
North Albion Collegiate Institute
TDSB Profile

High schools in Toronto
Education in Etobicoke
Schools in the TDSB
Educational institutions established in 1962
1962 establishments in Ontario
Toronto District School Board